Pearson Lake is a lake in the Moira River and Lake Ontario drainage basins in Addington Highlands, Lennox and Addington County, Ontario, Canada.

The primary inflow is the Skootamatta River from Joeperry Lake at the northwest; a marsh at the north of the lake forms a second connection from Joeperry Lake. The Skootamatta River is also the primary outflow, at the southeast, towards Skootamatta Lake. The Skootamatta River flows via the Moira River into the Bay of Quinte on Lake Ontario at Belleville.

See also
List of lakes in Ontario

References

Lakes of Lennox and Addington County